Ikki may refer to:

Ikki, revolts against samurai rule in 15th and 16th century Japan
Ikkō-ikki, ikki revolts organized by Jōdo Shinshū Buddhists
Kaga ikki, an Ikkō-ikki break-away warrior and peasant confederacy based in Kaga Province
Saika Ikki, a Buddhist warrior group based in Ōta, Kii Province
Yamashiro ikki, a warrior and peasant confederation in Yamashiro Province
Iga ikki and Kōka ikki, confederations of ninja families in the respective regions of Iga Province and Kōka District. These formed an alliance together.
Oyamato ikki, a warrior and peasant confederation in the Oyamato District of Ise Province
Monthly Ikki, a semi-alternative manga magazine
Ikki (video game), an arcade game released by Sunsoft in 1985
IKKI, the Russian acronym for Executive Committee of the Communist International

Fictional characters
Ikki, a character from the animated television series The Legend of Korra
Ikki Tenryou, a character from the manga and anime Medabots
Ikki, a porcupine in Rudyard Kipling's List of The Jungle Book characters#In the Mowgli stories
List of Air Gear characters#Itsuki Minami, a character from the manga and anime Air Gear
Ikki Igarashi, one of the main List of Kamen Rider Revice characters#Ikki Igarashi

People
Ikki (given name), a Japanese masculine given name
Ikki Twins (born 1981), American models and TV personalities